Calvin University is a Presbyterian-affiliated university in South Korea.  The campus is located in Giheung-Gu, Yongin City, Gyeonggi province, to the south of Seoul.

Academic departments

Undergraduate
Theology
Missionary Work
Preschool Gospel Education
Church Music

History

The school was established as the Evening School of Theology (야간신학교) in Seoul in 1954.  It became a full seminary in 1962, and a four-year college (Calvin Theological College) in 1976. The current campus was purchased in 1980.  A missionary research institute was established in 1989.   The school formally became a university in 1997, and the graduate school was founded in 1999.

See also
List of colleges and universities in South Korea
Education in South Korea

External links
Official school website, in Korean

Educational institutions established in 1954
Universities and colleges in Gyeonggi Province
1954 establishments in South Korea